The 3rd Pennsylvania Regiment, first known as the 2nd Pennsylvania Battalion, was raised on December 9, 1775, at Philadelphia, Pennsylvania for service with the Continental Army.  The regiment would see action during the Battle of Valcour Island, Battle of Brandywine, Battle of Germantown, Battle of Monmouth and the Battle of Springfield. The regiment was furloughed, on June 11, 1783, at Philadelphia, Pennsylvania and disbanded on November 15, 1783.

External links
Bibliography of the Continental Army in Pennsylvania compiled by the United States Army Center of Military History

Military units and formations established in 1775
Military units and formations disestablished in 1783
Pennsylvania regiments of the Continental Army